Donald Maltby Parrish Jr. (born October 27, 1944), better known as Don Parrish, is an American adventurer and former technical manager at AT&T Bell Laboratories. He is best known for his worldwide travels. Not only has he visited all 193 Member states of the United Nations, but has completed the Travelers' Century Club list of 327 countries, becoming the 26th member of the club to do so. He has also visited 937 of the 1013 locations on the Most Traveled People list. According to some media reports and travel blogs, he is considered one of the most traveled people in the world, ranked 3rd in the Most Traveled People and 17th in Nomad Mania travel blog list. He is ranked #1 on the MTP list as of July 2022.

Early life and education
Donald Maltby Parrish Jr was born on October 27, 1944 in Washington, D.C., to Donald Maltby Parrish and Herdis Borgny Anderson. After moving to Iowa, a few months before his fourth birthday, the Parrish family moved to Dallas where he grew up.

Parrish graduated in 1962 from W.W. Samuell High School in Dallas, Texas. He studied at the University of Texas, receiving a Bachelor of Arts degree in mathematics in June 1966. He graduated from the University of Chicago with a Master of Science degree  in Computer Science in June 1968. 

After retirement, Parrish studied Web design and Spanish for two years at the College of DuPage from 2001 to 2003.

Career
In June 1966, Parrish began working for Bell Labs in Holmdel Township, New Jersey
before being transferred to the new Indian Hill Laboratory in Naperville. Parrish worked in the call processing group designing programs that switched telephone calls under computer control and provided new services to subscribers.

In 1972, Parrish was transferred from Bell Labs to Illinois Bell to be the Switching Manager responsible for Aurora, Illinois for two years. In 1977 AT&T decided to sell its Electronic Switching Systems overseas. Parrish volunteered to work in the International Switching development organization in a newly created role as its planning manager.

In 1984 and 1985 Parrish made three trips to China to secure the first 5ESS Switch project to enter the local switching market. Parrish initiated the development of the 5ESS International Gateway Switch for Singapore. In late 1990 Parrish was assigned to break into the Japanese market.

Parrish retired in 1996 at the age of 51 and continued working for another five years as a consultant until he quit for good in 2001.

Travel
Parrish became interested in travel as a child. He read the complete book of Marvels by the adventurer Richard Halliburton. Parrish made what was his third flight as a ten-year-old in 1955 when he flew from Dallas to Chicago.

In 1965 when Parrish was 20 he visited West Germany for the summer and worked as an unskilled laborer in a metal factory  in Hanau near Frankfurt. Parrish purchased an old motorcycle and lived in a room in the home of a German family. By 1969 he was exploring the Soviet Union and Eastern Europe. Parrish visited the Soviet Union during the height of the Cold War. He made his first trip around the world in 1971.

Parrish has 13 passports and has visited more than 60 islands by ship. He has also flown 5 million air miles.

In 1983, Parrish completed his first major travel objective of visiting each of the 50 U.S. states. In 2011 he completed visits to each one of the member states of the United Nations. In February 2017, he completed the Travelers' Century Club (TCC) list of 325 countries, becoming thus the 26th person of the club to do so.

During his travels Parrish has been detained by Jamaican authorities, cheated death on a Nepali road and was injured in a fall while rock climbing in Wisconsin. Yet he has said, "I've never regretted any of it because I haven't been on a single trip where I didn't learn something new."

During his trip to the Democratic People's Republic of Korea, Parrish, who knows Hangul, and his fellow travelers experienced the guided sights of North Korea, including the war museum and monuments to Kim Il-sung, the founder of the North Korean republic. Parrish was selected by his group to place flowers at the grave of Kim Il-sung's wife, Kim Jong-suk.

Parrish visited the South Pole on its 100-year anniversary. When he was 66, Parrish visited the last United Nations country on his list when he visited Mongolia in 2011.

After visiting Conway Reef, 280 miles from the main islands of Fiji, on November 2, 2013, Parrish became the number one ranked on World's Most Traveled People. In 2017 his friends from a small group of travelers called ETIC awarded him the title of "the world's most-traveled man".

Parrish has sometimes traveled with fellow Illinois resident and businessman Robert Bonifas. According to Bonifas, "travel is all Don talks and thinks about." Writing for the BBC Dave Seminara said of Parrish, "For him, travel is an adventure akin to a sacred experience. It is about learning, but it's also about connecting with people in order to form lasting friendships and to better understand the places he visits."

In his 2014 piece for the Circumnavigators Log, writer Kevin Short said of Parrish, "He's a veritable
information sponge that finds something to learn everywhere and from everyone." In the same article Parrish is quoted as saying he enjoys travel because of the "emotional bonding that you occasionally get when you travel."

Along with fellow top travelers from MTP, Parrish is considered to have traveled more miles than Ferdinand Magellan and Captain James Cook. He counts the North Pole as a place he would still like to visit.
After traveling the world, Parrish considers the United States as his favorite country.

He lives in the suburbs of Chicago.

Personal life
Parrish is a lifelong bachelor and has no children.

Parrish is co-founder of the Libertarian Party of Illinois. He was the Libertarian Party candidate for the United States Senate election in Illinois, 1986.

Media
Parrish was profiled by the Daily Herald in 2014.
He was profiled by the BBC in 2015  
and by Die Zeit in 2016. 
In 2017 he was interviewed by Ric Gazarian for the Counting Countries podcast.
Parrish has been featured in: Chicago Tribune,
New York Post, NBC , Daily Herald, Emirates Airlines magazine, The Daily Telegraph and CBS Radio.
In December 2019 he was mentioned in the Colombian magazine Avianca.

Accomplishments
 He has traveled to almost half of the world's 1121 UNESCO World Heritage sites.
 Parrish is the Webmaster of the Chicago Chapter of the Circumnavigators Club. He is also a former Treasurer. Apollo 8 and Apollo 13 astronaut Jim Lovell autographed Parrish' Circumnavigators Membership certificate when he joined in 1989.
 Parrish is the Webmaster of the Fox Valley (Illinois) Chapter of the Sons of the American Revolution. He also served as President from 2003 through 2007, becoming the longest serving President.
 Parrish holds a US patent for Dynamic network automatic call distribution.

Awards
Parrish received the ETIC Award for 2018. Presented to him in Baghdad during the "Extreme Traveler International Congress", Parrish was dubbed the "Champion of the World" among extreme travelers, for his lifetime achievements within the Extreme Traveler community.  
Parrish was presented with an award by the Travelers' Century Club president on March 11, 2017. The award includes an engraved plaque on a pedestal of European crystal and a globe that rotates by Solar power. Parrish received the award for completing the TCC travel list of 325 countries
In 2015, BBC Travel named Parrish as one of six travel pioneers for 2015.

References

Further reading
 Ryan Trapp & Lee Abbamonte (2015). "Chasing 193: The Quest to Visit Every Country in the World". Createspace.

External links
BBC online profile
Personal website of Don Parrish
Daily Herald video profile

1944 births
Living people